Murvica is a village in Croatia, located in the Poličnik municipality in Zadar County. It is connected by the D8 highway.

Populated places in Zadar County